Brittney Marie Miller (born 1974) is a Democratic member of the Nevada Assembly. She represents the 5th district, which covers parts of the western Las Vegas Valley.

Biography
Miller was born in 1974 in Detroit, to a Detroit police sergeant and a civilian U.S. Army employee. She received her bachelor's degree from Saginaw Valley State University, master's degree in public administration from Oakland University, and Master of Arts in teaching from Sierra Nevada College. Miller previously taught at Canarelli Middle School in the Clark County School District.

Miller was elected to the Assembly in 2016, prevailing in a 3-way Democratic primary and winning a close general election. She was supported by Our Revolution. and endorsed by the Clark County Black Caucus.

Political positions
Miller supports expanding background checks for gun purchases.

Electoral history

References

External links

 
 Campaign website
 Legislative website

1974 births
Living people
African-American schoolteachers
Schoolteachers from Nevada
American women educators
African-American state legislators in Nevada
African-American women in politics
Democratic Party members of the Nevada Assembly
Politicians from Detroit
Politicians from Las Vegas
Women state legislators in Nevada
21st-century American politicians
21st-century American women politicians
21st-century African-American women
21st-century African-American politicians
20th-century African-American people
20th-century African-American women